Sabrina Grdevich is a Canadian actress.

Sabrina portrayed Dana Ballard in the 1999 made-for-TV movie Ultimate Deception with Yasmine Bleeth. Her starring roles include Mile Zero and Lola. Other roles included playing Cathy Blake in Traders, voice roles of Ann Granger and Sailor Pluto in the Sailor Moon R series and Maxine Reardon, on CBC's Intelligence.

Filmography

Film

Television

External links

Canadian film actresses
Canadian people of Slovenian descent
Canadian people of Italian descent
Canadian television actresses
Canadian voice actresses
Living people
People from Brampton
Actresses from Ontario
20th-century Canadian actresses
21st-century Canadian actresses
Best Supporting Actress in a Television Film or Miniseries Canadian Screen Award winners
Year of birth missing (living people)